The Revolutionary Independent Labour Movement (Movimiento Obrero Independiente y Revolucionario), or MOIR, is a left-wing party in Colombia that was founded in 1970. Francisco Mosquera was the founder and ideological leader of MOIR. In August 1994 he died, after which Hector Valencia became the Secretary General of the party. In 2008 Valencia died and the union leader Gustavo Triana, vice president of the country's largest union (Central Unitaria de Trabajadores - CUT), was elected Secretary General.

The MOIR describes itself as "a political party of the working class. Its primary mission is to lead the proletarian class struggle in Colombia for its ultimate emancipation, establishment of socialism in Colombia and realize communism. Defend the people's interests and the Colombian nation and its immediate objective is the New Democratic Revolution".

In the 2006 the MOIR united with other revolutionary and democratic movements in the Alternative Democratic Pole (Polo Democrático Alternativo - PDA). The MOIR works with farmers in the "National Association for Agricultural Salvation" (Asociación Nacional por la Salvación Agropecuaria), with students in the "Colombian Student Organization" (Organización Colombiana de Estudiantes - OCE), with industrial workers (with other movements Central Unitaria de Trabajadores - CUT), with consumers "National League of public services users"(Liga Nacional de Usuarios de Servicios Públicos) and intellectuals "Center for Labor Studies" (Centros de Estudios para el Trabajo-CEDETRABAJO).

The youth wing of the party is called "Patriotic Youth" (Juventud Patriotica - JUPA).

In the legislative elections of 2002, the MOIR won a senate seat with a senator named Jorge Enrique Robledo. Later in the legislative elections in 2006 and 2010, he was reelected senator, with a total of 80,969 and 165,339 votes respectively, the last time with the third largest vote in that election. The Colombian economic news magazine "Portafolio" considered Robledo the best senator of Colombia for his efforts in defense of agriculture, workers, education, health, national economics, users of public services, Colombian sovereignty and democracy.

Election results

References

External links
Official web site
"Center for Labor Studies" web site

1970 establishments in Colombia
Communist parties in Colombia
Labour parties
Political parties established in 1970